Belinda Wright (born 16 September 1980) is a softball player from Australia. She won a bronze medal at the 2008 Summer Olympics.

Wright, who was born in Cessnock, New South Wales, won bronze at the 2006 world championships, and was named MVP for the 3rd round of the 2007 national league.

References

External links
 Australian Olympic Committee profile

1980 births
Australian softball players
Living people
Olympic softball players of Australia
Softball players at the 2008 Summer Olympics
Olympic bronze medalists for Australia
People from the Hunter Region
Olympic medalists in softball
Medalists at the 2008 Summer Olympics
Sportspeople from Newcastle, New South Wales